Uenoa is a genus of stonecase caddisflies in the family Uenoidae. There are about 12 described species in Uenoa, found in Asia.

Species
These 12 species belong to the genus Uenoa:

 Uenoa arcuata Wiggins, Weaver & Unzicker, 1985
 Uenoa burmana (Mosely, 1939)
 Uenoa fernandoschmidi Botosaneanu, 1979
 Uenoa hiberna Kimmins, 1964
 Uenoa hindustana (Martynov, 1936)
 Uenoa janetscheki Botosaneanu, 1976
 Uenoa laga (Mosely, 1939)
 Uenoa lobata (Hwang, 1957)
 Uenoa parva (Mosely, 1939)
 Uenoa punja (Mosely, 1939)
 Uenoa taiwanensis Hsu & Chen, 1997
 Uenoa tokunagai Iwata, 1927

References

Further reading

 
 
 

Trichoptera genera
Integripalpia